Sandra Zilles is a Canadian computer scientist, currently a Canada Research Chair at University of Regina. Her research area encompasses Machine Learning in particular and Computational Learning Theory in general.

References

Year of birth missing (living people)
Living people
Academic staff of the University of Regina
Canadian computer scientists
Canadian women computer scientists